In the Shinto religion of Japan,  is the patron kami (deity) of academics, scholarship, of learning, and of the intelligentsia.

Tenjin is the deification of Sugawara no Michizane (845–903), the famous scholar, poet and politician of the Heian period.

Ten  means sky and jin means god or deity. The original meaning of Tenjin, sky deity, is almost the same as that of Raijin (a god of thunder).

Sugawara no Michizane

In Japanese history, Sugawara no Michizane rose high in the government of the country in the late 9th century, but at the beginning of the 10th century, he fell victim to the plots of a rival, a member of the Fujiwara clan, and was demoted and exiled to Kyushu. He died in exile in 903. On July 21, 930, the capital city was struck by heavy rain and lightning, and many of the leading Fujiwara died, while fires caused by lightning and floods destroyed many of their residences. The court of the Emperor drew the conclusion that the disturbances were caused by Michizane's , and, to placate it, the Emperor restored all Michizane's offices, burned the official order of exile, and ordered that the poet be worshiped under the name Tenjin, which means sky deity. A shrine was established at Kitano; it was e first rank of official shrines, supported directly by the government.

Scholarly Works

Evolution into the patron of scholars
For the first few centuries, then, Tenjin was seen as a god of natural disasters, worshiped to placate him and avoid his curses. However, Michizane was a famous poet and scholar in his lifetime, one of the greatest of the Heian period, and in the Edo period scholars and educators came to regard him as a patron of scholarship. By the present day, this view has completely eclipsed natural disasters in popular worship.

Tenjin's influence is now regarded as particularly strong in passing exams, and so many school students, and their parents, pray for success at his shrine before important entrance exams, and return afterward, if appropriate, to give thanks for success.

Things related to Tenjin

Michizane was very fond of ume trees, writing a famous poem from exile in which he lamented the absence of a particular tree he had loved in the capital. Legend states that it flew from Kyoto to Dazaifu in Kyushu to be with him, and the tree is still on show at his shrine there. As a result, shrines to Tenjin often are planted with many ume trees. By coincidence, these trees blossom in February, the same time of year as exam results are announced, and so it is common for Tenjin shrines to hold a festival around this time. 

The animal particularly associated with Tenjin is bull because, according to legend, during Michizane's funeral procession, the bull pulling the cart bearing his remains refused to go any further than a certain spot, which was then built up into his shrine.

Shrines

The main shrines to this kami are Kitano Tenman-gū in Kyoto and Dazaifu Tenman-gū in Fukuoka Prefecture, and the top three are rounded out by Egara Tenjin Shrine in Kamakura, but there are many other shrines dedicated to him across Japan. These shrines are called . A group of three notable shrines has been called the Three Great Tenjin Shrines..。

Worship

Sugawara no Michizane is associated with luck in exams.

On February 25, which is Sugawara no Michizane's memorial day, ceremonies are held at temples across Japan. These ceremonies are considered to give benefits for exams.

However, when referring to the shrines as the "Three Great Tenjin Shrines", there are cases where Dazaifu Tenmangu is left out and Kitano Tenmangu is left in.。

See also
 Benzaiten: A Japanese Kami of Intelligentsia (the Japanese name for the Hindu goddess, Saraswati).  
 Omoikane: A Japanese Kami of knowledge, music, art, speech, wisdom, learning, and patron of the Intelligentsia.  
 Yoshida Shōin: Deified intellectual, like Sugawara no Michizane.  
 Kui Xing: Chinese god of examinations.  
 Brahma: Hindu god of creation; also a patron god of those who 'make use of knowledge in their professions (teachers, students, scientists, etc.).  
 Minamoto no Yoshiie: A samurai who, like how Sugawara no Michizane became Tenjin, became Hachimantaro; Patron Ancestral Kami of the Minamoto Clan.  
 Benedict of Nursia: Patron saint of students and scholars.
 Imhotep: An ancient Egyptian polymath who was deified.
 Enheduanna: A Sumerian high-priestess, who was deified after her death.
 Hitogami
 Tenmangū
 Grand Kitano Tea Ceremony
 Prunus mume

Further reading
Shintō no Iroha, Jinja Shinpōsha, 2004.
Mihasi, Ken, Wa ga ya no Shūkyō: Shintō, Daihōrin-Kaku, 2003.

External links 

 Image of a statue of Tenjin reading on the back of an ox, Bernheimer Gardens, Pacific Palisades, Los Angeles, California, est. 1938. Los Angeles Times Photographic Archive (Collection 1429). UCLA Library Special Collections, Charles E. Young Research Library, University of California, Los Angeles.
 天神さま - 神社本庁
 板橋区　徳丸　北野神社

References

Bibliography 
 
 
 
 

Deified people
Japanese gods
Shinto kami
Sugawara no Michizane
Tenjin faith
Cattle deities
Faith
Japanese folk religion
Shinto
Goryō faith
Shinto cults